Mietta O'Donnell (6 January 19504 January 2001) was a Melbourne-based Australian restaurateur, chef and food writer, described in her later years as Australia's leading culinary publisher and critic.  She was also a noted arts and music patron, and a song competition is named in her honour.

Career
O'Donnell's grandparents were Italian migrants, Teresa and Mario Vigano, who arrived in Melbourne from Milan in 1928 to establish 'Mario's' restaurant in Exhibition Street, Melbourne, which they ran for over thirty years.  O'Donnell, with her partner Tony Knox, opened her restaurant 'Mietta's' in Brunswick Street, North Fitzroy in June 1974.  'Mietta's' moved in 1985 to Alfred Place in central Melbourne, eventually closing in 1995.

In February 1992, Jex Saarelaht and Kate Ceberano performed at the restaurant. They recorded and later released an album titled Open the Door - Live at Mietta's.

She was killed in a car accident in Tasmania while traveling to speak at a food and wine seminar.  Her funeral was attended by over 1,000 people from the arts, politics, and the culinary world.

Mietta Song Competition
'Mietta's' restaurant had also become a salon of the arts, including music. In 1995, along with her partner Tony Knox, Len Vorster, Michael Easton and Lauris Elms, O'Donnell co-founded an annual art song competition which she ran herself.  In 1996, it was named the City of Melbourne Song Recital Award.  After her death in 2001, the competition was revived in 2003, as the Mietta Song Recital Award.  Since 2004 it has been held every two years.  It is now known as the Mietta Song Competition.

Publications
Books authored by O'Donnell include:
 1996 – Mietta and Friends. Wilkinson Books: Melbourne. 
 1999 – Great Australian Chefs. (With Tony Knox). Schwartz Publishing: Melbourne. 
 2000 – Mietta's Italian Family Recipes. Black Inc.: Melbourne.

References

1950 births
2001 deaths
20th-century Australian writers
20th-century Australian women writers
Australian chefs
Australian food writers
Australian restaurateurs
Women restaurateurs
Australian people of Italian descent
Australian women writers
Australian patrons of music
Women food writers
Women cookbook writers
Road incident deaths in Tasmania
Women chefs
20th-century philanthropists